Ashton Lodge is a Grade II listed building in Royal Tunbridge Wells. It was formerly known as Jordan Lodge and appeared under that name in a 1738 map of the town by John Bowra, who named John Jeffrey as the owner.

Thomas Bayes lived in the house from 1734 to 1761.

References

Buildings and structures in Royal Tunbridge Wells
Grade II listed buildings in Kent
Grade II listed houses in Kent